Hocombe Mead is a   Local Nature Reserve in Eastleigh in Hampshire. It is owned and managed by Eastleigh Borough Council.

The site has two species-rich meadows. The north one, which is grazed by cattle, has a large colony of ringlet butterflies, while the south one is maintained by cutting. There are also woods, with some parts more than 400 years old. There are small areas of bog and heath.

References

Local Nature Reserves in Hampshire